Like the NASCAR Cup Series, NASCAR's second-tier Xfinity Series has had many close finishes since electronic scoring was implemented in 1993. The current record for closest finish was set on February 17, 2018 during the 2018 PowerShares QQQ 300 at Daytona International Speedway, when Tyler Reddick defeated Elliott Sadler at a recorded margin of 0.0004 seconds.

Closest finishes
NOTE:  All finishes are after 1993, when NASCAR implemented electronic timing.

See also 
 Photo finish
 List of the closest NASCAR Cup Series finishes
 List of the closest NASCAR Truck Series finishes

Notes

References

External links 
 Racing-Reference.info Xfinity Series page 

Closest NASCAR Xfinity Series finishes
Closest Xfinity Series finishes
Closest finishes